Thottakkonam  is a village in Pathanamthitta district, Kerala, India.

Places of Worship
 Pandalam Mahadeva Temple  
 Karipoor Bhagavathi Temple

Education
 Govt Higher Secondary School, Thottakkonam

References

Villages in Pathanamthitta district